Gymnasium Paulinum is a Gymnasium (secondary) school in Münster, North Rhine-Westphalia, Germany. It was founded in around 797 and is claimed to be the oldest school in Germany.

Early history
Gymnasium Paulinum was established by Ludger the missionary in 797. He had been instructed by Charlemagne in 793 to preach Christianity in north-western Saxony, and subsequently established a monastery in the centre of the former Frankish stronghold of Mimigernaford (also Mimigardeford or Miningarvard), which was later to be known as Münster. He also established a monastic school for future members of the clergy. In 805, when Ludger was appointed Bishop of Münster, the school became a cathedral school. The new "Schola Paulina" was dedicated to St. Paul.

Latest developments
On October 9th, 2007 the Gymnasium Paulinum was awarded the title "School of Europe" (Europaschule) as one of the first of 15 schools in the province of North Rhine-Westphalia.

Notable alumni
Heinrich Brüning, Chancellor of Germany from 1930 to 1932
Bernhard von Galen, prince-bishop of Münster
Johann Glandorp, 16th century humanist, theologian, and scholar
Leonard Landois, physiologist
Hermann Löns, journalist and writer
Josef Pieper, philosopher
Hans Tietmeyer, economist

See also
 List of Jesuit sites

External links
Gymnasium Paulinum

Schools in North Rhine-Westphalia
Educational institutions established in the 8th century
790s establishments
Culture in Münster